Paste is a term for any very thick viscous fluid. It may refer to:

Science and technology
 Adhesive or paste
 Wallpaper paste
 Wheatpaste, A liquid adhesive made from vegetable starch and water
 Paste (rheology), a substance that behaves as a solid and a liquid depending on applied load
 Paste gem, a diamond simulant made from rock crystal, glass, or acrylic

Computing
 Paste (Unix), a Unix command line utility which is used to join files horizontally
 Paste, a presentation program designed by FiftyThree
 Cut, copy, and paste, related commands that offer a UI interaction technique for digital transfer from a source to a destination
 Python Paste, a set of utilities for web development in Python

Arts, entertainment and media
 Paste (magazine), a monthly music and entertainment digital magazine
 "Paste" (story), a 5,800-word short story by Henry James
 Paste (album), an album by punk rock band Alien Father

Food
 Paste (food), a Semi-liquid colloidal suspension, emulsion, or aggregation used in food preparation
 Purée, a Food paste made with cooked ingredients 
 Spread (food), a ready-to-eat food paste
 Paste (pasty), a small pastry produced in Mexico

See also
 Cut and paste (disambiguation)
 Paaste, a village in Estonia